Jizera Mountains, or Izera Mountains, are part of the Western Sudetes on the border between the Czech Republic and Poland. The range got its name from the Jizera River, which rises at the southern base of the Smrk massif. The beech forests within the Jizera Mountains were added to the UNESCO World Heritage Site known as Ancient and Primeval Beech Forests of the Carpathians and Other Regions of Europe, because of their outstanding preservation and testimony to the ecological history of Europe (and the beech family specifically) since the Last Glacial Period.

Geography
[[File:Jizerské hory - Sněžné věžičky1.jpg|thumb|Sněžné věžičky (Czech "snow turret"): picturesque rock pinnacle in the Jizerské hory]]
The range stretches from the Lusatian Mountains (Zittau Mountains) in the northwest to the Krkonoše in the southeast. The Jizera Mountains comprise the sources of the Jizera river, as well as of the Kwisa and the Lusatian Neisse.

The major part in the south is formed from granite, in the northern part from gneisses and mica schists, with some areas formed from basalt.

The weather conditions are characterized by above-average annual precipitation. On 30 July 1897, the measuring station at Nová Louka recorded a daily precipitation amounting to 345.1 mm (13.6 inches), still an unbroken European record.

 Peaks 

The highest peak is Wysoka Kopa (Hinterberg, 1,127 m, 3,698 feet) near the town of Szklarska Poręba in Poland. Neverteheless, a better-known mountain is Smrk (1124 m, 3,688 feet), with a recently rebuilt look-out tower. Other peaks include Jizera (1,122 m, 3,681 feet) and Stóg Izerski (Heufuder, 1,107 m, 3,632). The peaks in order of elevation:
 Wysoka Kopa (Hinterberg), 1,127 m; highest peak of the Jizera Mountains
 Smrk (Tafelfichte), 1,124 m; highest peak of the Bohemian Jizera Mountains
 Jizera (Siechhübel), 1,122 m
 Stóg Izerski (Heufuder), 1,107 m
 Smědavská hora (Wittigberg), 1,084 m
 Bukovec (Buchberg), 1,005 m; one of the highest basalt peaks in Europe
 Hvězda (Stefanshöhe), 959 m
 Černá Studnice (Schwarzbrunnberg), 869 m
 Tanvaldský Špičák (Tannwalder Spitzberg), 831 m; skiing region near Tanvald
Oldřichovský Špičák (Buschullersdorfer Spitzberg), 724 m

 History 

The first settlements in the area date back to prehistory. Later on, Celts, German tribes resides in the valleys until they left in 5th century. Later came Lusatian Sorbs. In the 14th century, German-speaking colonists came and started clearing of the dense primeval forests. Permanent settlements were established. In the 16th century, several glass works were founded. Glassmaking had a profound effect on the ecosystem. The primeval forest was gradually replaced by fast-growing spruce monoculture. Other important industries included tin-mining, metallurgy and textile. 

In the second half of the 20th century, the ecosystem was badly hit by emissions, produced by lignite fired power stations located in the Zittau basin, part of Europe's ecological Black Triangle.  Weakened spruce forest, less resistant against various types of parasites, were on the verge of extinction. The higher parts of the mountains, once densely wooded, became largely treeless, in part also because of excessive deforestation. New roads cut through the once-secluded landscape.

The situation improved only after the fall of communism in 1989. Open-pit coal mines in the former East Germany were closed, as well as several major power plants.  Emission filters were installed at the immense Turów Power Station in Bogatynia on the Polish side of Lusatian Neisse. At the same time large-scale reforestation projects were started.

 Tourism 

The Jizera Mountains are an attractive location for winter sports, cycling and hiking. The centre for both downhill skiing and ski run is Bedřichov. The international cross-country races Jizerská 50 and Bieg Piastów (in Polana Jakuszycka) take place there. Its summer MTB counterpart is also gaining popularity.

The towns surrounding the mountains include Liberec, Frýdlant v Čechách, Nové Město pod Smrkem, Świeradów Zdrój, Szklarska Poręba, Desná, Tanvald and Jablonec nad Nisou.

 Protections 
Large parts of the Jizera Mountains are under some form of protection. In the smaller Polish parts, the peat bogs in Jizera Valley are part of a relatively small nature protection of about 5 km²; Rezerwat Torfowiska Doliny Izery. In the Czech parts, Jizera Mountains Protected Landscape Area (CHKO Jizerské hory) covers 368 km², or almost all of the Czech parts of the mountains. This landscape protection contains several reserves, including the Jizera Dark Sky Park (Rašeliniště Jizery''), dedicated to star watching.

Literature
  Weiss, Siegfried (2000) Moje Jizerky - Jizerské hory v proměnách času, Mein Isergebirge - Das Isergebirge im Wandel der Zeit, My Jizera Hills - The Jizera Mountains through a changing of time, Buk
  Nevrlý, Miroslav (1996) Kniha o Jizerských horách, 3rd edition, Civitas

References

External links

 Photos of Jizera Mountains
  Jizerskehory.cz
  The Jizera Mountains throughout time
  The Jizera Mountains 3D Photos gallery

Sudetes
Old-growth forests
Mountain ranges of Poland
Mountain ranges of the Czech Republic